Koast II Koast is the seventh studio album by American hip hop group Kottonmouth Kings. It was released on June 6, 2006 via Suburban Noize Records. Recording sessions took place at Suburban Noize Compound and at Electric Ghetto Studios in Venice Beach. Production was handled by Mike Kumagai and member Daddy X, who also served as executive producer together with Kevin Zinger. The album peaked at number thirty-nine on the Billboard 200, No. 14 on the Top Rock Albums, No. 19 on the Top Rap Albums, No. 3 on the Independent Albums, No. 39 on both the Top Internet Albums and the Billboard Comprehensive Albums in the United States.

Track listing

Personnel
Brad "Daddy X" Xavier – vocals, producer, executive producer
Dustin "D-Loc" Miller – vocals
Timothy "Johnny Richter" McNutt – vocals
Robert "DJ Bobby B" Adams – vocals, turntables
Mike Kumagai – producer, mixing, engineering
Tom Baker – mastering
Kevin Zinger – executive producer, management
Larry Love – artwork
Jeremy McClure – design
Barry Underhill – photography
Patrick Axe – photography
Ian Montone – legal
Ron Opaleski – booking

Charts

References

External links

2006 albums
Kottonmouth Kings albums
Suburban Noize Records albums